William Ellis Atkins (November 19, 1934 – November 5, 1991) was an American football defensive back and punter from Auburn University who played for the San Francisco 49ers in the National Football League, and in the American Football League for the Buffalo Bills, the New York Titans/Jets, and the Denver Broncos.  He was an AFL All-Star in 1961.

On January 8, 1966, Atkins was named the head coach of the Troy State Trojans football team.  In 1968, he coached Troy State to an NAIA National Championship and was named the NAIA Coach of the Year.  Atkins finished at Troy State with a 44–16–2 record before leaving in 1971.  He is the second-most winningest coach in Troy history, only behind Larry Blakeney.

Atkins' son, author William Ellis "Ace" Atkins Jr., also played football at Auburn and was member of its 1993 undefeated team.

Head coaching record

See also
 List of American Football League players

References

External links
 
 

1934 births
1991 deaths
American football defensive backs
American football punters
American Football League players
Auburn Tigers football players
Buffalo Bills players
Denver Broncos (AFL) players
New York Titans (AFL) players
New York Jets players
San Francisco 49ers players
Troy Trojans athletic directors
Troy Trojans football coaches
American Football League All-Star players
People from Lamar County, Alabama
Coaches of American football from Alabama
Players of American football from Alabama